Valamirankottai is a village in the Thanjavur taluk of Thanjavur district, Tamil Nadu, India.

The name comes from Rajaraja cholan history. One time he was visited this place and he saw a small lake. He was removed the sword and kept in under the tree. After drink the water again take the sword, but can't take it back. Aat the same time he saw the God Sivan over the tree. So he created a Sivan temple and named the sword sit port, in Tamil Valamirankottai.

Demographics 
At the 2001 census, Valamirankottai had a total population of 1623 with 638 males and 614 females. The sex ratio was 962. The literacy rate was 71.06.

References 

Villages in Thanjavur district